Massarelos is a former civil parish in the municipality of Porto, Portugal. In 2013, the parish merged into the new parish Lordelo do Ouro e Massarelos. The population in 2011 was 6,789, in an area of 1.94 km².

The municipality includes parts of the city's old downtown, classified by UNESCO as a World Heritage Site. Other landmarks include Porto's main Custom House, Rosa Mota sports hall, Porto's major fish market and the Campo Alegre neighborhood, where a theatre and several buildings of the University of Porto are located.

Notable residents
 Luciana Abreu (born 1985) is a Portuguese singer, actress and Television host, represented Portugal in the Eurovision Song Contest 2005 as part of the pop-duo 2B
 Diogo Jota (born 1996) is a Portuguese professional footballer who plays as an attacking midfielder for English club Liverpool FC.

References

Former parishes of Porto